Großer Priepertsee is a lake in the Mecklenburg Lake District, in the German state of Mecklenburg-Vorpommern. It is in the district of Mecklenburgische Seenplatte.

Navigation is administered as part of the Obere–Havel–Wasserstraße.

References 

Lakes of Mecklenburg-Western Pomerania
Federal waterways in Germany
LGrosserPriepertsee